Julio César Galofre Montes  (born 27 July 1987) is a Colombian swimmer who competed in the 2008 Summer Olympics.

References

1987 births
Living people
Sportspeople from Barranquilla
Colombian male freestyle swimmers
Olympic swimmers of Colombia
Swimmers at the 2008 Summer Olympics
Pan American Games competitors for Colombia
Swimmers at the 2007 Pan American Games
South American Games gold medalists for Colombia
South American Games silver medalists for Colombia
South American Games bronze medalists for Colombia
South American Games medalists in swimming
Central American and Caribbean Games gold medalists for Colombia
Competitors at the 2006 South American Games
Competitors at the 2010 South American Games
Competitors at the 2014 South American Games
Competitors at the 2010 Central American and Caribbean Games
Central American and Caribbean Games medalists in swimming
20th-century Colombian people
21st-century Colombian people